The canton of Boulogne-sur-Mer-1 is an administrative division of the Pas-de-Calais department, in northern France. It was created at the French canton reorganisation which came into effect in March 2015. Its seat is in Boulogne-sur-Mer.

It consists of the following communes: 
Boulogne-sur-Mer (partly)
La Capelle-lès-Boulogne 
Conteville-lès-Boulogne
Pernes-lès-Boulogne
Pittefaux
Wimereux
Wimille

References

Cantons of Pas-de-Calais